The Shawn McDonald discography is about the works of contemporary Christian musician Shawn McDonald.

Discography

Studio albums

Live albums

EPs

Singles

Music videos
This is a list of music videos by Shawn McDonald.

Other album appearances 
This is a list of other album appearances by Shawn McDonald on various albums.

References

Discographies of American artists
Christian music discographies